Ludwika is a given name. Notable people with the name include:

Ludwika Jędrzejewicz (1807–1855), sister of Polish composer Frédéric Chopin
Ludwika Karolina Radziwiłł (1667–1695), magnate of the Grand Duchy of Lithuania in the Polish-Lithuanian Commonwealth and an active reformer
Ludwika Lubomirska (died 1829), Polish noble lady
Ludwika Maria Gonzaga (1611–1677), Queen consort to two Polish kings: Władysław IV, and Jan II Kazimierz
Ludwika Maria Poniatowska (1728–1781), Polish noble lady
Ludwika Paleta (born 1978), Polish-born Mexican television actress
Ludwika Maria Rzewuska (1744–1816), Polish noble lady
Ludwika Wawrzyńska (1908–1955), Polish teacher who worked at an elementary school in Warsaw
Maria Ludwika Krasińska (1883–1958), Polish noble lady
Teofilia Ludwika Zasławska (1650–1709), Polish noble lady

Polish feminine given names